The 1986 Coppa Italia Final was the final of the 1985–86 Coppa Italia. The match was played over two legs on 7 and 14 June 1986 between Roma and  Sampdoria. Roma won 3–2 on aggregate.

First leg

Second leg

References
Coppa Italia 1985/86 statistics at rsssf.com
 https://www.calcio.com/calendario/ita-coppa-italia-1985-1986-finale/2/
 https://www.worldfootball.net/schedule/ita-coppa-italia-1985-1986-finale/2/

Coppa Italia Finals
Coppa Italia Final 1986
Coppa Italia Final 1986